Yenikənd is a municipality and village in the Oghuz Rayon of Azerbaijan. It has a population of 379.

References

Populated places in Oghuz District